Karakeçili is a town and district of Kırıkkale Province in the Central Anatolia region of Turkey. At the 2000 Turkish census the population of the district was 8,296, of whom 7,851 lived in the town of Karakeçili.

Notes

References

External links 
  

Populated places in Kırıkkale Province
Districts of Kırıkkale Province